Sekhauliya is the name of a village in Uttar Pradesh, ( Ayodhya division ) in the Ambedkar Nagar district . It is situated 2 km away from sub-district headquarter Alapur and 40 km away from district headquarter Ambedkar Nagar. As per 2009 stats, Madhuwana is the gram panchayat of Sekhauliya village. Another name of this village is Tapsi Nagar 
The same name is also written along with the polling station and school (172 Late Vidya Devi Kanya School Tapsi Nagar)
The total geographical area of village is 48.14 hectares. Sekhauliya has a total population of 355 peoples. There are about 53 houses in Sekhauliya village.

Nearby College 

 Pt.

See also

Ambedkar Nagar district
Ramnagar, Alapur
 Ayodhya

References

External links
(sekhauliya.weebly.com) 
villageinfo.in 

Villages in Ambedkar Nagar district